Robert Skepper (born 3 April 1938) is a British alpine skier. He competed in three events at the 1960 Winter Olympics.

Arms

References

1938 births
Living people
British male alpine skiers
Olympic alpine skiers of Great Britain
Alpine skiers at the 1960 Winter Olympics
Place of birth missing (living people)